Wiggle and Learn is an Australian TV show that aired on ABC. It ran from June 17, 2007, to September 8, 2008. It is The Wiggles 6th TV series. It was the first TV series to not feature Greg Page, who had to depart the group in 2006 due to poor health, and the only one to feature Sam Moran as the Yellow Wiggle, as well as the last Wiggles show until Ready, Steady, Wiggle! in 2013. It was also the final series with Murray Cook and Jeff Fatt as the Red Wiggle and Purple Wiggle, respectively.

Unlike the Wiggles’ five previous TV series, Wiggle and Learn uses Nursery Rhymes instead of self-written songs. Also, the theme song was not written, either. Instead, it is a rewritten version of another song that was made in 2006 to promote ABC Kids, with Page as the yellow Wiggle., although that might had been filmed alongside other filming materials while using animated backgrounds such as the ones in a Where Are They Now? episode about The Cockroaches.

There have been four versions of the series.

 Version 1: 22-minute version
 Version 2: 11-minute version
 Version 3: Original 2006 version (Revealed in 2015)
 Version 4: Original 2006 Version of the Theme Song (ABC Kids Promo)

Supporting cast
 Paul Paddick as Captain Feathersword
 Emily McGlinn as Dorothy the Dinosaur
 Voiced by Carolyn Ferrie
 Adrian Quinnell, Kristy Talbot, and Ben Murray as Wags the Dog
 Voiced by Mic Conway
 Mario Martinez-Diaz and Rebecca Knox as Henry the Octopus
 Voiced by Paul Paddick

Production

Development
The Wiggles first pitched the idea in early 2006 and wanted to have Greg Page in it. After filming three episodes, Page was diagnosed with Dysautonomia and was unable to participate and the episodes were eventually re-shot with Sam Moran. In 2015, Anthony Field, Murray Cook, and Jeff Fatt found the original footage while lurking around on the computer. The original footage of the sets was also used for their very first documentary 15 Years of Wiggly Fun.

Episodes

22-minute versions

11-minute versions

Writing
The original draft  consists of three plots: 
The Wiggles and Dorothy the Dinosaur plan to go on a picnic.
The Wiggles play soccer on the beach.
The Wiggles must save their friends by singing songs.

Broadcast
The Australian version aired from 2007 to 2008 on ABC and Playhouse Disney. Then the Canadian version premiered April 2008 on Treehouse TV and the US version aired December 2008 at 7/6c am on Playhouse Disney. It also re-ran on that block in January 2009 running at 11am weekdays, 7am weekends, and would continue to do so up until May of that year.

It is also the first Wiggles TV show to be completely dubbed in another language (In other countries such as Italy, earlier Wiggles TV shows had the dialogue dubbed but the songs remained in English). It aired in Spanish as "Wiggle y Aprende" on Playhouse Disney in Latin America and later Disney Junior, and on Disney Junior in Brazil as "Wiggle e Aprenda".

The show remained in reruns in some countries, most notably Australia and Latin America, until 2013 or 2014, despite Sam Moran being fired from The Wiggles in 2012 due to Greg Page's return, and Murray Cook and Jeff Fatt leaving the group in 2013.

DVD releases

References

External links
The show's list on ABC.com

Australian Broadcasting Corporation original programming
Australian children's television series
Australian television shows featuring puppetry
2000s Australian television series
2007 Australian television series debuts
2008 Australian television series endings
2008 American television series debuts
2009 American television series endings
The Wiggles
Musical television series
English-language television shows
Australian preschool education television series
2000s preschool education television series